The 2009 Pan American Women's Handball Championship was the tenth edition of the Pan American Women's Handball Championship, which took place in Santiago from 23 to 27 June. It acted as the Pan American qualifying tournament for the 2009 World Women's Handball Championship.

Participating teams

Qualification
Chile, Mexico, Puerto Rico and the United States played a qualification tournament at Mexico, to determine the last 2 participating nations.

Standings

Semifinals

Bronze medal match

Gold medal match

Teams

Preliminary round
All times are local (UTC−3).

Group A

Group B

Placement round
Points from the preliminary round against teams that advanced as well were carried over.

Final round

Semifinals

Bronze medal match

Gold medal match

Final standing

Best team
Goalkeeper:  Valentina Kogan
Right wing:  Alexandra do Nascimento
Right back:  Fabiana Aluan
Central back:  Silvana Totolo
Left back:  Damaris Bencomo
Left wing:  Fernanda da Silva
Pivot:  Antonela Mena

References
Results at todor66.com

Pan American Women's Handball Championship
Pan American Women's Handball Championship
Pan American Women's Handball Championships
2009 in Chilean women's sport
Sport in Santiago
June 2007 sports events in South America